Jaki Byard at Maybeck: Maybeck Recital Hall Series Volume Seventeen is an album of solo performances by jazz pianist Jaki Byard.

Music and recording
The album was recorded at the Maybeck Recital Hall in Berkeley, California in 1991. Byard played in a variety of styles: "It's all here, the lyrical and the rollicking, the finely-tuned comic flair and roving, impish imagination filtered through a bedrock sense of swing and surpassing technical command".

Release and reception

It was released by Concord Records in 1991. The AllMusic reviewer concluded that this was "an excellent outing" by "one of the most underrated jazz pianists of all time".

Track listing
"Hello, Young Lovers" – 7:12 	
"Tribute to the Ticklers" – 5:27 	
"My One and Only Love" – 7:28 	
"European Episode" – 11:01 	
"Collage of Thelonions Monk" – 7:40 	
"'Round Midnight/Friday the Thirteenth/Ruby My Dear" – 2:22 	
"Dedication to Art Blakey, Walter Davis, Leonard Bernstein and Aaron" – 14:37

Personnel
Jaki Byard – piano

References

1991 albums
Albums recorded at the Maybeck Recital Hall
Jaki Byard live albums
Solo piano jazz albums